Ahmad Salehi is an Iranian football referee.

Awards
 Referee of the year (1): 2014–15

References

External links
 Seyed Ahmad Salehi at Football Federation Islamic Republic of Iran site
 

Iranian football referees
Living people
Sportspeople from Isfahan
1972 births